Created in 1967 during Lyndon B. Johnson's society initiative, the Corporation for Public Broadcasting (CPB) is the primary national organization charged with the development of public television and radio in the United States. To fulfill the goal, CPB provided support to the producing and broadcasting of non-commercial public programs, "which are both alternatives to commercial programs, and representative of the cultural diversity of American peoples." The minority communities, including the Asian Americans, found this opportunity to "assert their presence in shaping future public television policy, in decision-making, and in pushing for multicultural programming and production."

Starting from the mid-70s, the Asian Pacific American media community started to produce documentaries and narrative films and videos on public television. Created out of the first Asian American media conference in 1980, and active since 1982, the National Asian American Telecommunications Association (NAATA, now known as the Center for Asian American Media) became a national presenter of Asian American films and video programs for public television. With core funding from CPB, NAATA was active in acquiring, packaging and presenting works by Asian producers on PBS. However, the CPB funding for Asian American media-creation remained marginal.

After long and constant struggles and debates, in 1988, the public broadcast legislation designated nine million dollars a year for independent and minority production and programming.

See also
Center for Asian American Media

References

Public television in the United States
Asian-American culture